Birger Olaus Vestermo (born 27 February 1930) is a Norwegian cross-country skier from Salangen. He competed in 50 km at the 1956 Winter Olympics in Cortina d'Ampezzo.

Cross-country skiing results

Olympic Games

References

External links

1930 births
Living people
People from Salangen
Norwegian male cross-country skiers
Olympic cross-country skiers of Norway
Cross-country skiers at the 1956 Winter Olympics
Sportspeople from Troms og Finnmark